The Symphony No. 3 in C minor, Op. 34, is a four-movement orchestral composition written from 1944 to 1945 by the Swedish composer Lars-Erik Larsson. The piece premiered in Stockholm on 10 February 1946 with Tor Mann conducting the Concert Society Orchestra. In response to unfavorable critical reviews, Larsson immediately withdrew the symphony after its premiere—a fate that, too, had earlier befallen his First (Op. 2, 1928) and Second (Op. 17, 1937) symphonies. (Reflecting, in a 1948 interview, on his penchant for self-criticism, Larsson explained that he was more talented at the smaller, less-structured forms and described his symphonies unsympathetically: "In [them] I have said nothing special. Other people have said much better ... [they] belong in my opinion to [my] process of development".) 

Nevertheless, he repurposed the finale—with a new introduction—as the Concert Overture No. 3. In 1973, however, the Swedish conductor  successfully revived the Symphony No. 2, an event which convinced Larsson that he had been too harsh a critic of his symphonic works. As a result, Larsson permitted Frykberg and the Royal Stockholm Philharmonic Orchestra to perform the Third in August 1975 over Swedish Radio.

Structure
The Third Symphony is in four movements. They are as follows:

Although  published the Concert Overture No. 3 (Movement IV), Larsson's Symphony No. 3 remains unpublished; apparently, the manuscript is—according to the BIS records liner notes from its 1989 release—under the copyright-collecting auspices of the Swedish Performing Rights Society (STIM).

Recordings
The sortable table below lists commercially available recordings of the Symphony No. 3:

Notes, references, and sources

 
 
 

Symphonies by Lars-Erik Larsson
20th-century classical music
Classical music in Sweden
1945 compositions